Osaka Ramones is Japanese pop-punk group Shonen Knife's 16th studio album. All of the songs on the album are cover songs of the punk group Ramones. The album's cover art takes its inspiration from the Ramones album Road to Ruin. Five songs on the album were recorded in at GCR Audio in Buffalo, New York with Producer Robby Takac in late 2010 and it was intended to be a mini-album. Lead singer/guitarist/songwriter Naoko Yamano later decided that Osaka Ramones would be a full-length album celebrating Shonen Knife's 30th anniversary. The rest of the album was later recorded in Osaka, Japan and mixed at GCR Audio.

Track listing

Personnel 
Naoko Yamano - guitar, vocals
Ritsuko Taneda - bass, backing vocals
Emi Morimoto - drums, backing vocals

References 

2011 albums
Shonen Knife albums
Covers albums
Ramones tribute albums
P-Vine Records albums